Tazeh Kand-e Kian (also Romanized as Tāzeh Kand-e Kīān) is a village in Savalan Rural District, in the Central District of Parsabad County, Ardabil Province, Iran. At the 2006 census, its population was 137, in 30 families.

References 

Tageo

Towns and villages in Parsabad County